In enzymology, a Delta24(241)-sterol reductase is an enzyme that catalyzes the chemical reaction

ergosterol + NADP+  ergosta-5,7,22,24(241)-tetraen-3beta-ol + NADPH + H+

Thus, the two substrates of this enzyme are ergosterol and NADP+, whereas its 3 products are ergosta-5,7,22,24(241)-tetraen-3beta-ol, NADPH, and H+.

This enzyme belongs to the family of oxidoreductases, specifically those acting on the CH-CH group of donor with NAD+ or NADP+ as acceptor.  The systematic name of this enzyme class is ergosterol:NADP+ Delta24(241)-oxidoreductase. Other names in common use include sterol Delta24(28)-methylene reductase, and sterol Delta24(28)-reductase.  This enzyme participates in biosynthesis of steroids.

References

 
 

EC 1.3.1
NADPH-dependent enzymes
Enzymes of unknown structure